Oxyna amurensis is a species of fruit fly in the family Tephritidae.

Distribution
Russia, China, Korea, Japan.

References

Tephritinae
Insects described in 1927
Diptera of Asia